Joe Pera Talks with You is an American comedy television series that first aired on Adult Swim on May 20, 2018. The series was created by Joe Pera and produced by Factual Productions, Inc, later Alive and Kicking, Inc. It entered development following the success of the 2016 specials Joe Pera Talks You to Sleep, which was animated, and Joe Pera Helps You Find the Perfect Christmas Tree, airing as part of Infomercials. The second season premiered on December 6, 2019. A third and final season aired from November to December 2021. In July 2022, Pera announced the show was canceled after three seasons.

Summary
The series stars comedian Joe Pera as a fictionalized version of himself, living in Michigan's Upper Peninsula and teaching choir at a local middle school. He talks directly to the viewer about everyday subject matter such as iron, Sunday breakfast, fall drives, and sleeping.

Characters
 Joe Pera (Joe Pera) is a self-proclaimed "soft-handed choir teacher" from Marquette. Though he is very introspective, with a vast knowledge of specific concepts, he expresses naïveté in his social interactions. 
 Mike Melsky (Conner O'Malley) is Joe's neighbor. The two meet in the show's first episode, when Mike attempts to buy Joe's house after neighborhood kids place a For Sale sign in his yard as a prank. He is generally sarcastic, short-tempered, and incredulous towards Joe.
 Sue Melsky (Jo Scott) is the wife of Mike Melsky. She is more friendly and accepting towards Joe.
 Gene Gibson (Gene Kelly), Joe's best friend. He likes to help Joe teach his lessons, and often ends up giving Joe advice in the process.
 Sarah Conner (Jo Firestone) is a new band teacher working at the same school as Joe. Many of her beliefs are rooted in conspiracies and fears for the future, as evidenced by her construction of a fortified basement below her house. She becomes Joe's love interest over the course of the first season.
 "Nana" Josephine Pera (Nancy Cornell in season 1, Pat Vern Harris in season 2) is Joe's grandmother, based on his real grandmother of the same name.
 Gus (Fitzgerald William) is Joe's lazy basset hound.

Predecessors
The first Pera project to appear on Adult Swim was the animated short, Joe Pera Talks You to Sleep. It was aired as part of the network's Infomercials series on March 21, 2016. The short was animated and directed by Kieran O'Hare, who had previously animated a Joe Pera comedy bit for his YouTube channel. O'Hare applied the same animation style to the Adult Swim special.

On December 9, 2016, a second special, Joe Pera Helps You Find the Perfect Christmas Tree, premiered on Adult Swim. The live-action special was more tonally similar to what would become Joe Pera Talks with You. Like the series, it was directed by Marty Schousboe and written by Pera alongside Dan Licata, and made by the same production team under the name Rent Now Productions. It also takes place in the same location in Michigan where Pera works as a choir teacher. It features characters that would later appear in the series, such as Gene, the Melsky family and Joe's Nana Josephine. Differences include Joe's dog Gus being a black bloodhound (or possibly a black lab mix) instead of a basset hound portrayed by Fitzgerald William, Joe living in a different house, and Joe's co-worker and love interest Sarah, portrayed in the series by Jo Firestone, being absent entirely. These differences imply the special and series are not within the same continuity. Joe's Nana Josephine was also played by his real-life grandmother, Josephine Pera, who died in 2017. The character Gene Gibson is also present in the Christmas special, but not portrayed by real-life camera operator, Gene Kelly, as he was in the series. Pera appeared on local talk shows to promote the special.

Episodes

Season 1 (2018)

Season 2 (2019–20)

Special (2020)

Season 3 (2021)

Reception
Joe Pera Talks with You has received critical acclaim, with much of the praise going towards the show's unique tone and writing. In a positive review, The A.V. Clubs Erik Adams writes that "It’s a particular type of funny, of the soft-spoken, deadpan, and disarming type that Pera practices onstage and on the talk-show circuit. It’s one of his many gifts as a performer, the way his understated wardrobe, deliberate delivery, and nervous body language set an expectation for awkwardness, before Pera pulls the rug out from under the audience with the confidence of his pacing and the precision of his writing." Indiewires Steve Greene gave the second season an A- and wrote "This is nice. There’s no irony, no rug pull, no cynicism in what he says. Just one person grateful for something that hasn’t even arrived yet. That’s the show in a nutshell: a chronicle of a guy so enthusiastic about the tiny pleasures of life that he’s even happy about potential things." The Ringer's Tyler Parker hailed the show as "the anti-cringe" of comedy show, adding, "If cringe comedy is the theater of the uncomfortable—crank up tension, break with laughter, repeat—then consider Joe Pera Talks With You the anti-cringe. A warm blanket of a comedy. Mellow, joyful, and good-hearted. A balm. Watch and relax."

References

Notes

External links
 
 

2018 American television series debuts
2021 American television series endings
2010s American comedy television series
2020s American comedy television series
Adult Swim original programming
English-language television shows
Television series by Williams Street
Television shows set in Michigan
Upper Peninsula of Michigan
Television series about educators